The 2014–15 Slovenian First League (known as the 1. NLB Leasing Liga for sponsorship reasons) was the 24th season of the 1. A liga, Slovenia's premier handball league.

Team information 

The following 14 clubs competed in the 1. A liga during the 2014–15 season:

Personnel and kits
Following is the list of 2014–15 clubs, with their manager, captain, kit manufacturer and shirt sponsor.

Regular season

Standings

Pld - Played; W - Won; D - Drawn; L - Lost; PF - Points for; PA - Points against; Diff - Difference; Pts - Points.

Schedule and results
In the table below the home teams are listed on the left and the away teams along the top.

References

External links
 Slovenian Handball Federaration 

2014–15 domestic handball leagues
Slovenian First League
Slovenian First League
Handball competitions in Slovenia